Tomkin Road was the first intermediate station on the Cavan and Leitrim Railway in Ireland. The station building is now a private residence and is located in Drumrush townland, parish of Drumlane, County Cavan.

References 

Disused railway stations in County Cavan
Railway stations opened in 1887